Xiaomi Redmi Note 5A is a smartphone developed by Xiaomi Inc. It is a part of the Xiaomi's low-end Redmi smartphone line, and has two variants, cheaper Redmi Note 5A is equipped with the Snapdragon 425 CPU while, the more expensive, Redmi Note 5A Prime variant has Snapdragon 435.

The phone has been renamed to Redmi Y1 in India, where film star Katrina Kaif launched the Redmi Y line of smartphones in Delhi on November 2, 2017.

Specifications

Hardware
The Xiaomi Redmi Note 5A has a 5.5-inch IPS LCD display, Quad-core 1.4 GHz processor(Model: mdg6), 2GBof RAM and 16GB of internal storage or Octa-core 1.4 GHz Cortex-A53 Qualcomm Snapdragon 435 processor, 3/4 GB of RAM and 32/64 GB of internal storage that can be expanded using microSD cards up to 256 GB. The phone has a 3080 mAh Li-Ion battery, 13 MP rear camera with LED flash and 16 MP front-facing camera with auto-focus. It is available in Gold, Dark Grey, Silver, Rose Gold colors.

Software
On release Redmi Note 5A and Note 5A Prime worked on MIUI 8 based on Android 7.1.2. They were updated to MIUI 11.

Sales
Xiaomi Redmi Note 5A went on sale in August 2017. The price was pegged at RMB 699 for the base model and RMB 899 for the Prime variant.

Xiaomi sold over 150,000 units of Redmi Note 5A and Redmi Note 5A Prime in 3 minutes after the India release on November 8, 2017.

Gallery

References

External links 
 
 Redmi Note 5A Specification

Phablets
Redmi smartphones
Mobile phones introduced in 2017
Discontinued smartphones
Mobile phones with infrared transmitter